Fellsburg may refer to:

Fellsburg, Kansas, an unincorporated community in Edwards County
Fellsburg, Pennsylvania, a census-designated place in Westmoreland County